G13 LTD Demo + Remixes a compilation album of remixes and demos by Cult of Jester, self-released in 2000 by Flaming Fish. It comprises different versions of tracks appearing of Cult of Jester's second studio album Golgo 13.

Track listing

Personnel
Adapted from the G13 LTD Demo + Remixes liner notes.

Cult of Jester
 Ed Finkler – vocals, instruments

Release history

References

External links 
 
 G13 LTD Demo + Remixes at Discogs (list of releases)

2000 compilation albums
Cult of Jester albums